The Guam national rugby union team represents the United States territory of Guam in international rugby union. They have yet to make their debut at the Rugby World Cup, though they have attempted to qualify for the World Cup.

The national side is ranked 74th in the world (as of 29 July 2019).

History
Guam attempted to qualify for the 2007 Rugby World Cup in France, taking part in Division 3 Pool B of Round 1a of the Asian qualifying tournament. They competed against three other nations in the pool; Kazakhstan, India and Malaysia.

In their first match of the pool competition, Guam played India in Guam and drew 8-all with them. However they then lost 51-6 to Kazakhstan and 44-15 to Malaysia. In 2006 they played two internationals, a 14-18 loss against the Philippines and a 27-22 loss against Pakistan.

World Cup record
 1987 - No qualifying tournament held
 1991 - 2003 - Did not enter
 2007 - Did not qualify
 2011 - Did not enter
 2015 - Did not qualify

Overall record
Below is table of the representative rugby matches played by a Guam national XV at test level up until 18 May 2019.

Squad
Squad to 2012 Asian Five Nations - Division 3

Leonard Calvo
Brendon O'Mallan
Carlos Eustaquio
Sixto Quintanilla
Fabian Garces
Basil O'Mallan
Paul Claros (c)
Steven Sablan
Vinson Calvo
Vern Lokeijak
Jacob Flores
Stephen Santos
Randy Mendiola
Gerard Aguon
Paul Eustaquio
Edward Calvo
Neil James
Joshua Jude 'Outside J' Paulino
Casey Howard 'C-Swag' Zinser

Substitutes
Matthew Toves
Earl Pascual 
John Arceo 
Brian Romiro
Paul Calvo
Mario Martinez
Jesse Manglona

Honours
Asia Rugby Championship 
Division 3 Champions: 2015, 2018

See also
 Rugby union in Guam
 2007 Rugby World Cup - Asia qualification
 Guam national rugby sevens team
 Guam women's national rugby union team

References

External links
 Guam on IRB.com
 Guam  on rugbydata.com

 
Asian national rugby union teams
Rugby union in Guam
National sports teams of Guam